The New Zealand men's national ice hockey team is the national ice hockey team for New Zealand. As of 2018, the New Zealand team is ranked 39th in the IIHF World Rankings. The official nickname of New Zealand's national ice hockey team is the Ice Blacks. The "Ice Blacks" nickname is one of many national team nicknames related to the All Blacks.

History

The 2016 documentary film "Ice Blacks" covers the history of the team, their rivalry with Australia and their difficulties in competing at international level because of New Zealand's geographic distance from the rest of the traditional ice hockey playing countries.

New Zealand has competed in the Division II World Championships since 2001. From 2007 to 2011, New Zealand was coached by Jeff Bonazzo. In his last year coaching at the 2011 Division II World Championships, New Zealand won three games and lost two, finishing second in their group behind host nation and rival Australia and missing promotion to Division I.

New Zealand hosted the 2003 IIHF World Championship Division III, which was held in Auckland. The Ice Blacks finished first and captured their first gold medal and were promoted to Division II.

New Zealand hosted the 2006 IIHF World Championship Division II Group B, which was held in Auckland. The Ice Blacks finished last and were relegated to Division III.

New Zealand hosted the 2009 IIHF World Championship Division III, which was held in Dunedin. The Ice Blacks finished first and captured their third gold medal by winning all five games and were promoted to Division II.

New Zealand hosted the 2017 IIHF World Championship Division II Group B, which was held in Auckland. The Ice Blacks finished second behind China, capturing their fourth silver medal.

Tournament record

New Zealand Winter Games

World Championship record
1987 – 27th place (3rd in "Pool D")
1989 – 29th place (5th in "Pool D")
1995 – 39th place (10th in "Pool C2")
1996 – Not ranked (2nd in "Pool D" group 1 qualifier)
1997 – Not ranked (2nd in unofficial "Pool E")
1998 – 38th place (6th in "Pool D")
1999 – 38th place (6th in "Pool D")
2000 – 39th place (6th in "Pool D")
2001 – 39th place (5th in Division II Group A)
2002 – 43rd place (3rd in Division II qualification)
2003 – 41st place (1st in Division III)
2004 – 37th place (5th in Division II Group B)
2005 – 38th place (5th in Division II Group A)
2006 – 39th place (6th in Division II Group B)
2007 – 41st place (1st in Division III)
2008 – 39th place (6th in Division II Group B)
2009 – 41st place (1st in Division III)
2010 – 36th place (4th in Division II Group B)
2011 – 32nd place (2nd in Division II Group A)
2012 – 34th place (6th in Division II Group A)
2013 – 36th place (2nd in Division II Group B)
2014 – 37th place (3rd in Division II Group B)
2015 – 36th place (2nd in Division II Group B)
2016 – 38th place (4th in Division II Group B)
2017 – 36th place (2nd in Division II Group B)
2018 – 36th place (2nd in Division II Group B)
2019 – 37th place (3rd in Division II Group B)
2020 – Cancelled due to the COVID-19 pandemic
2021 – Cancelled due to the COVID-19 pandemic
2022 – Withdrawn due to the COVID-19 pandemic

All-time record against other nations
As of 8 September 2018

All-time record against other clubs
As of 15 April 2019

References

External links
Official website
IIHF profile

 
National ice hockey teams in Oceania
Ice hockey teams in New Zealand